Ziaabad (also Romanized as Ẕīā’ābād) is a village in Shirang Rural District, Kamalan District, Aliabad County, Golestan Province, Iran. As of the 2006 census, its population was 272, in 60 families.

References 

Populated places in Aliabad County